Fun Palaces is an annual, free, nationwide celebration of culture at the heart of community, using arts, science, craft, tech, digital, heritage and sports activities as a catalyst for community engagement.  This takes place over the first weekend in October every year.  Fun Palaces are community events, created by and for local people.  They are held in a variety of locations, ranging from libraries, shopping centres, schools, parks, village squares, community halls, swimming pools, etc.  The original (never built) Fun Palace was the brainchild of celebrated theatre director Joan Littlewood and architect Cedric Price. Their never-realised vision was re-interpreted for the 21st century with the Fun Palaces campaign for cultural democracy, with community-led events in many locations. The first weekend of action took place in 2014, with 138 Fun Palaces taking place across the UK and internationally and in 2015 the number rose to 142, 292 Fun Palaces in 2016, and 362 in 2017.

History 

Joan Littlewood and the architect Cedric Price came up with the idea of the Fun Palace as one building in 1961.  It was their dream to build a space where people in the community could come together to celebrate arts, science and culture.  Their original blueprint said:

Inspiration for the idea came from traditional pleasure gardens and working men's institutes, which were very much for the community as a whole.  They wanted to build a radical venue which was to be a "laboratory of fun" or a "university of the streets", where visitors could go along and enjoy performances, participate in arts and craft activities or just meet up and have fun.  As a result, allowing culture, science and education to be available to people from all backgrounds.

The palace was never built. Councils would not give the land, the permissions and the money just did not materialise. As such the Fun Palace became an unrealised dream.  All this changed in 2013 when the first call for venues and organisation to create their own Fun Palaces locally was suggested by Stella Duffy, co-founder (with Sarah-Jane Rawlings) of the Fun Palaces organisation. On the 4 and 5 October, hundreds of Fun Palaces, supported by the Fun Palaces organisation, appeared across the UK and beyond.  Instead of building new buildings, temporary 'pop-up' fun palaces, appeared in various venues and locations.

During the first weekend, 138 venues and companies enlisted along with independent artists, scientists and community events organisers. Since then there have been annual weekends of action on the first weekend of October every year.

Manifesto 

The Fun Palaces Manifesto is:

References

External links 

 

Cultural festivals in the United Kingdom
Science festivals
Recurring events established in 2014